Ocean Park Hong Kong, commonly known as Ocean Park, is a marine mammal park, oceanarium, animal theme park and amusement park situated in Wong Chuk Hang and Nam Long Shan in the Southern District of Hong Kong. It is the second largest theme park in Hong Kong, after Hong Kong Disneyland, as well as the largest theme park in Hong Kong by area. It is also the second oldest theme park in Hong Kong, after the now-defunct Lai Chi Kok Amusement Park which closed on 31 March 1997, four months before the 1997 handover.

Opened on 10 January 1977, Ocean Park became popular, but 28 years later, it was unprofitable and widely expected to close due to the new Hong Kong Disneyland. However, the Park responded with a HK$5.5 billion development plan that saw it expand to over 80 attractions and rides, and steadily grow visitor numbers to 7.6 million in 2014, making it the world's 13th most visited theme park, and one of the largest theme parks in Asia. Half of all visitors now come from mainland China, in growth that parallels rising mainland tourist visitor levels to Hong Kong over the same period.

These areas can be reached by a  cable car system, or the Ocean Express funicular railway. To ascend the Headland, which comprises several hills, visitors can use Hong Kong's second longest outdoor escalator. The theme park has various attractions and rides, including four roller coasters, and also animal exhibits with different themes, such as a giant panda habitat, rainforest and polar displays, as well as an aquarium featuring the world's largest aquarium dome. Between 1979 and 1997, Ocean Park was most famous for its signature killer whale, Miss Hoi Wai/Susie Wong.

As well as being an amusement park, Ocean Park Hong Kong aims to merge entertainment and education, including conservation advocacy. However, it has been criticised by wildlife advocates for practices including the wild capture of large sea animals, such as dolphins and orca, and the presentation of shows featuring such animals performing.

Ocean Park is also renowned for holding the largest Halloween events in Asia.

History and development
Opened on 10 January 1977 by the Governor of Hong Kong, Sir Murray MacLehose, Ocean Park was constructed as a subsidiary of the Hong Kong Jockey Club, with HK$150 million of funding. The land was provided free by the Hong Kong Government. Between 1982 and 1984, the Jockey Club put a further HK$240 million into developing facilities at Tai Shue Wan and thrill rides at the Summit.

Ocean Park ceased to be a Jockey Club subsidiary on 1 July 1987, becoming its own statutory body, with a Government-appointed Board. The Jockey Club established a HK$200 million trust to ensure the Park's continued development. At present, Ocean Park is managed by the Ocean Park Corporation, a financially independent, non-profit organisation.

In 2003, Allan Zeman, known for leading the creation of the popular Lan Kwai Fong entertainment district of Hong Kong, was appointed Chairman of Ocean Park Corporation, a position he held for 11 years.

In 2005, the same year that the park's rival Hong Kong Disneyland opened, Ocean Park unveiled a HK$5.5 billion  redevelopment plan, under which older features at the park were rejuvenated and new areas developed. The number of attractions more than doubled, from 35 to over 80. The Lowland was redeveloped as a new area called the Waterfront, while the old 'Headland' became 'The Summit', with polar and rainforest exhibits. A dedicated thrill ride area, Thrill Mountain, opened, and the children's area was refurbished as Whisker's Harbour.

The first of the new developments, Amazing Asian Animals, showcasing some of the Asia's endangered creatures, including giant pandas, red pandas, Chinese giant salamanders, Asian small-clawed otters and the Chinese alligators, and Ocean Express, a funicular train system capable of transporting 5,000 visitors per hour between the Summit and the Waterfront, were launched in 2009.

In January 2011, Aqua City was opened. The zone features the Grand Aquarium, designed by St. Louis-based PGAV Destinations, displaying some 5,000 fish from over 400 species, and the world's first and only 360° water screen show Symbio.

In June of the same year, the Rainforest, an integrated theme zone featuring over 70 exotic animal species, was opened.

In March 2012, the new attraction zone Old Hong Kong opened, evoking the streetscapes and spirit of Hong Kong between the 1950s and the 1970s from various perspectives. In April, the newly refurbished Hong Kong Jockey Club Sichuan Treasures opened. In July, the final element of the redevelopment, Polar Adventure, opened, featuring animals such as penguins, Pacific walruses, spotted seals, northern sea lions, snowy owls and Arctic foxes, aiming to highlight some of the conservation issues they face.

A 20,000 sq ft shark aquarium opened in July 2014 at the former Atoll Reef site called Shark Mystique.

On 19 February 2019, Ocean Park officially opened its first hotel: The Hong Kong Ocean Park Marriott Hotel.

In January 2020, the park sought HK$10 billion from the government for a major upgrade, following a 14 percent decline in visitor numbers and a cash-flow crisis. The government was ready to support the move, but legislators from both sides had concerns.

Visitor growth 
The park's expansion steadily grew visitor numbers to 7.6 million in 2014, making it the world's 13th most visited theme park, and one of the largest theme parks in Asia. From this high, visitor numbers declined to around six million in 2016 against the background of declining tourist arrivals in Hong Kong and competition from Chimelong International Ocean Tourist Resort in Zhuhai. In January 2017, the Ocean Park saw a 30% surge in visitors, credited to a new rapid transit line, big discounts and an early Lunar New Year holiday, but in 2019, lower numbers of mainland tourist arrivals, due to social unrest and continued competition from Chimelong, sunk attendance to 5.7 million.

Senior leadership

Chairman 

 Kenneth Fung (1977–1982)
 David Newbigging (1982–1984)
 Gordon MacWhinnie (1984–1993)
 Ronald Carstairs (1993–1996)
 Robert Kwan (1996–1997)
 Payson Cha (1997–2000)
 Philip Chen (2000–2003)
 Allan Zeman (2003–2014)
 Leo Kung (2014–2020)
 Lau Ming-wai (2020–2022)
 Paulo Pong Kin-yee (2022– )

Chief Executive Officers 

 John Corcoran (1996?-1999)
 Randolph Guthrie (1999–2004)
 Tom Mehrmann (2004–2016)
 Matthias Li (2016–2020)
 Ysanne Chan (2020–2021)
 Ivan Wong (2021– )

Attractions
Ocean Park now comprises two main attraction areas: the Waterfront and the Summit, subdivided into eight attraction zones: Amazing Asian Animals, Aqua City, Whiskers Harbour, Marine World, Polar Adventure, Adventure Land, Thrill Mountain and the Rainforest.

Rollercoasters

Water Rides

Flat Rides

Transport Rides

The Summit

Marine World

This area was formerly known as two distinct areas: Marine Land and Headlands Rides.
Pacific Pier – Mimics the rocky habitat of harbour seals and California sea lions on the Northern Californian coast.
Chinese Sturgeon Aquarium – Yangtze River Exploration – The 3,500 square-metre freshwater aquarium houses Chinese sturgeons along with other native species of the Yangtze River, closed in 2019.
Ocean Park Tower, Closing soon
Sea Jelly Spectacular – Opened in 2006. Southeast Asia's first standalone sea jelly exhibit.
The Dragon – Arrow Dynamics Custom Looper, first rollercoaster to feature a Sidewinder., closed in February 2021.
The Abyss – A turbo drop ride, closed since 31/8/2021.
Flying Swing, closing soon.
Wild Twister – A Mondial Ventura
Crazy Galleon – A Huss Pirate ship, closing soon.
Ferris Wheel, closing soon.
Marine World Games Zone
Garden of Joy

Thrill Mountain 

Thrill Mountain was opened in December 2011. It is a carnival-themed area of 222,800 square feet. It offers five rides, eight booth games, as well as food, beverages, and merchandise.

Hair Raiser – A floorless rollercoaster built by B&M with four inversions.
Whirly Bird – A chair swing ride that soars 30 meters into the air
Bumper Blaster – Bumper cars that can carry two in each car 
Rev Booster - A spinner ride 
The Flash - A swing ride that goes upside down, with its top speed being 60 km/h, at a height of 22m up into the air
 Bungee Trampoline – A trampoline that allows visitors to jump really high while strapped in bungee harnesses

Polar Adventure

Polar Adventure was opened on 13 July 2012, featuring the North Pole Encounter, South Pole Spectacular and Arctic Fox Den, as well as the Arctic Blast roller coaster.

The attraction's carbon footprint is reduced through environmental technology including a ventilation system that recycles residual cool air to cool down the Life Support System (LSS) and plant room area before being discharged, which it is claimed cut electricity consumption by a third.

Arctic Blast – A steel "roller coaster" located in the Polar Adventure with various dips and side turns. It is suitable for the whole family.
North Pole Encounter – visitors can meet Pacific walruses and spotted seals, and other animals from the North Pole including Steller sea lions and snowy owls. The animals can also be viewed via an underwater tunnel.
South Pole Spectacular – It is home to three penguin species: king penguins, southern rockhopper penguins and gentoo penguins. The viewing chamber, glass-panelled floors, walkways and balconies overlooking the water allow visitors to see the penguins from different angles.
Arctic Fox Den – visitors can see Arctic foxes here to learn about their behaviour and the impact of humans on their habitat.

The Rainforest

The Rainforest was opened on 14 June 2011. Dozens of avian, terrestrial and aquatic animals living inside buttress roots accompany visitors on their immersive exploration of biodiversity. You will Get Wet on This ride, as water guns and sudden drops can and will soak you.

The Rapids – A family river rapids ride along a rushing river that surrounds the themed zone.
Expedition Trail – A walk-through rainforest exhibits where, visitors can meet some of the world's most striking tropical species, including Linnaeus's two-toed sloths, kinkajous, capybaras, toco toucans, green anacondas and more.
Rainforest Why Zone – Trainers explain about rainforest animals in the wild and in captivity.

The Waterfront

Aqua City
Aqua City was opened on 26 January 2011 and occupies around 200.000 square feet. It features:

 Grand Aquarium – Inside the Grand Aquarium, visitors can get up close to some 5,000 fish from over 400 species, such as the scalloped hammerhead and reef manta ray. Strolling through the Reef Tunnel and Panoramic Ocean Gallery, visitors can see the world's largest viewing dome in an aquarium, at 5.5 metres in diameter, and a 13-metre acrylic viewing panel, one of the largest in the world. It also features the world's first and only 360° water screen show Symbio! and Hong Kong's only restaurant inside an aquarium.
 Sea Life Carousel – Hong Kong's largest carousel, 15.1 metres across, with 61 carriers in 13 different designs inspired by endangered sea animals, holding up to 81 passengers.
 Old Hong Kong – Offers an immersive experience of culture, history, and delicacies of Hong Kong between the 1950s and the 1970s. It features a replica of Edinburgh Place Ferry Pier's clock tower and its signature toll, a manually retrofitted heritage tramcar and rows of tong lau-style apartment buildings. Visitors can also try more than 70 types of local street food and beverage that evoke the flavour of old Hong Kong. The area also provides a wide array of classic booth games.
 Waterfront Plaza – Features a lively carnival setting with a rotating mix of shows, magic and other acts performed by clowns, acrobats and jugglers. This area sets the backdrop for many of Ocean Park's festive events.

Amazing Asian Animals
Giant Panda Adventure – A purpose-built habitat that houses two rare giant pandas - Ying Ying and Le Le, as well as red pandas. It also houses the critically endangered Chinese giant salamander.
Panda Village – displays Asian small-clawed otters and a variety of Asian bird life in a woodland setting.
Gator Marsh – A wetland setting, featuring endangered Chinese alligators from the Yangtze River.
Goldfish Treasures – A goldfish pavilion featuring the latest and rarest varieties such as the Black Oranda and Blue Phoenix Eggfish. Explains the history and importance of the goldfish in Chinese culture.
Hong Kong Jockey Club Sichuan Treasures – home to two golden snub-nosed monkeys, Le Le and Qi Qi, from Sichuan. Le Le and Qi Qi's offspring, Lokie (born 2017), is the first golden monkey born in Hong Kong and also resides there. The exhibit also acts as a resource centre on the care and conservation of this species. Pandas Jia Jia and An An also once lived there until their deaths.
Emerald Trail – A verdant garden featuring natural settings with flowers, tall trees, stone bridges and gentle pools.

Whiskers Harbour
Whiskers Harbour, previously called Kid's World, features attractions for younger children, over an area 14,200 square metres.

Balloon Up-up-and-away – A hot air balloon-themed Ferris wheel for very young visitors.
Clown a Round – This merry-go-round has clown cars for younger kids to whirl around in.
Frog Hopper – A kid's version of a thrill ride. Young visitors strap into the mechanised 'frog', hop high into the air and land back on their feet.
Merry-go-round – A classic children's merry-go-round with gilded fairytale horses.
Bouncer House – An inflatable, fully padded, covered house for children to bounce around in.
Whiskers Harbour Playground – A safe, child- (and parent)-friendly haven for kids to run around and explore slides, see-saws, tunnels and jungle gyms.
Interactive Shadow Play – Kids get to play simple spelling and skill games on interactive multimedia screens. Correct answers are rewarded with audiovisual presentations.
Animal Story Corner – Children can explore interactive educational displays about different land, air and sea animals, and what makes each of them distinct.
Whiskers Harbour Games Zone – The area offers over twenty classic arcade games.
Toto the Loco – A small train that takes young visitors through a mini forest to meet clowns playing accordions, cellos and violins.
Little Meerkat and Giant Tortoise Adventure - A newly opened display that shows meerkats and Aldabra giant tortoises in a theme of the African Savannah

Former attractions
Former attractions of Ocean Park include:
 Atoll Reef. It was located in Marine Land (now Marine World). Closed in early 2011 after 34 years of operation, many of the animals were transferred to the new Grand Aquarium. It was converted into Shark Mystique, which houses several species of sharks.
 Middle Kingdom. Opened in 1990, this area featured traditional Chinese culture and heritage along with buildings resembling traditional Chinese buildings. It closed in 2001, but the Middle Kingdom Restaurant was in operation until 2007.
 The Bird Paradise area, located in Tai Sue Wan near Adventure Land, closed down in 2013. It contained The Aviaries and Flamingo Pond. Plans are underway to redevelop this area into Water World.
Space Wheel: A HUSS Enterprise. Formerly located in the Adventure Land section of the park.

Shows

Star Explorers Club
Located in Bambooz Zone, Star Explorers Club showcases various animals. The show is on selected dates at 2:30pm.

Marine Mammal Caretaking Workshop
Located in the Ocean Theatre, the show provides visitors with more opportunities to close encounter dolphins and sea lions, get to know their daily lives and conservation tips. Show Times: Weekdays: 12pm, 3:30pm, 5pm / Weekends & Holidays; 11:30am, 2pm, 3:30pm, 5:30pm

Animals
Ocean Park holds over 12,000 animals and highlights its educational and scientific research programmes, alongside the animal displays and entertainment.

The Park has had success breeding rare shark species, Indo-Pacific bottlenose dolphins, sea lions, seahorses, penguins, green anacondas, red-handed tamarins, pygmy marmosets and several species of sea jellies. Endangered birds and butterflies are also hatched and reared at Ocean Park.

Giant pandas 

A pair of giant pandas, a male named  An (安安) and a female called Jia Jia (佳佳), were given to Ocean Park by China in 1999. The pair were given permanent homes in the 'Hong Kong Jockey Club Sichuan Treasures' area. In 2007, two more pandas were given to Hong Kong to mark the 10th anniversary of Hong Kong's return to Chinese sovereignty. The pair of two-year-old pandas, a male called Le Le (樂樂) and a female named Ying Ying (盈盈), arrived at Ocean Park from the China Conservation and Research Centre in Wolong in Sichuan province. After quarantine, they made their first public appearance in Giant Panda Adventure on 1 July 2007. A new compound was prepared at the park to house them on their arrival. In 2019, Ocean Park said that they were thinking if 14-year-old panda pair Le Le and Ying Ying didn't give birth to a cub some time later, Ocean Park will send them back to the Wolong National Nature Reserve or back into the wild of Sichuan. In August 2015, Jia Jia became the oldest breeding panda in the world at the age of 37. Sadly, Jia Jia began to suffer the effects of advanced aging in October 2016, refusing most food and fluids and rapidly losing weight. On 16 October, after having been found unable to walk, her vets decided to euthanize her. Then age 38 (114 in panda years), she was sometimes billed as the oldest panda in the world. She was definitely known to be the oldest panda in captivity. Although there is no such certain data regarding pandas in the wild, their life expectancy in the wild is 15 to 20 years, giving the claim a good likelihood of being correct.

Dolphins 
The Park's Marine Mammal Breeding and Research Centre houses nine Indo-Pacific bottlenose dolphins. In July 2009, Domino and Dumisa, two dolphins from Bayworld in Port Elizabeth, South Africa, arrived at Ocean Park. The dolphins, a father and daughter pair, were separated to ensure that they do not mate with each other. They formed part of Ocean Park's breeding programme. In May 2001, two of Ocean Park's female dolphins, Ada and Gina, each delivered a healthy calf, a female and male respectively, the world's first two bottlenose dolphin calves as a result of artificial insemination. This marked an important development in reproductive physiology and controlled breeding of marine mammals.

Killer whale – Miss Hoi Wai 
Hoi Wai was a female killer whale, captured near Iceland in 1977 and kept at Ocean Park from January 1979 to April 1997. She died from an emergency intestine infected wound in 1997. In Hong Kong, Miss Hoi Wai (海威小姐) is still considered an icon and celebrity to this day.
She was kept with Prince, a male killer whale who lived at the park from April 1989 until his death in July 1991. They produced no offspring.

Chinese sturgeon 

The Chinese sturgeon were introduced to the park in 2008, and as at 2013, Ocean Park houses nine Chinese sturgeons, displayed in Chinese Sturgeon Aquarium – Yangtze Exploration. To mark China's hosting the Olympic Games, the Chinese Central Government made a gift of five rare Chinese sturgeon, symbolising the five Olympic rings, with Ocean Park as the recipient. Two were bred by the Yangtze River Fisheries Research Institute and three by the Beijing Aquarium. The fish made their debut on 20 June 2008. However one of them died after a few days, apparently bitten by a barracuda. On 14 July 2008, it was announced that Hong Kong would receive another five sturgeon from the Chinese National Aquatic Wildlife Conservation Association in time for 8 August opening ceremony, to complement the four fish already in situ. The park's management opted to evict its sharks from their aquarium in favour of the new arrivals. On 12 December 2008, a second sturgeon died from an infection. A third one died from an injury and two nine-year-old sturgeon were found to be ill in January 2009. The two sick fish, measuring 2.3m and 1.5m, were returned to the Yangtze River Fisheries Research Institute for expert care.
Ocean's Park returned to mainland China the last batch of six Chinese sturgeon in December 2019.

Animal encounter programmes
Ocean Park runs a series of programmes called "Get Closer to the Animals" which offer supervised access to its resident animals, from swimming with dolphins to learning to be a panda keeper. Holders of a diving certificate can even enter the Grand Aquarium, while an overnight camp within its dome offers a drier way to view the underwater world. There are behind-the-scenes tours of many facilities, often including the chance to get close to animals such as penguins, seals and other polar animals.

Animal mascots
Ocean Park introduced a waving sailor sea lion named Whiskers (known as Wai Wai in Chinese) as its major mascot in 2000. Subsequent members of the Ocean Park 'family' include James Fin (a shark), Jewel (a butterfly, now retired), Swift (a dolphin), Chief (a parrot), Professor (a turtle), Later Gator (a crocodile), Fluffi (an Arctic fox), Redd (a red panda), Goldie (a goldfish), Tux (a penguin), Doug (a rockhopper penguin), and four giant pandas: An An, Jia Jia, Le Le and Ying Ying.

Internal transport

It has a capacity of 4,000 passengers per hour with 252 cable cars on two pairs of ropeways. Each car can hold six passengers.

Hong Kong's second-longest outdoor escalator system, at 225 metres (738 feet) long provides the main link between facilities at Tai Shue Wan and the Summit. (The longest system is the Central–Mid-Levels escalators).

The "Ocean Express" funicular railway system between the Summit and the Waterfront can carry 5,000 people per hour on its three-minute journey. This themed ride uses multimedia effects to simulate the feeling of travelling into the depths of the sea.

Access

Mass Transit Railway 

Ocean Park station on the South Island line is located adjacent the main entrance of the park. The station opened on 28 December 2016 and connects Ocean Park directly to Hong Kong's MTR system, from Admiralty station.

Bus 
The Citybus Ocean Park Express (Route 629) used to provide departures from Central Piers to Ocean Park only. This route has since stopped its regular service due to a decline in passenger numbers.

Passengers may use any of the Aberdeen Tunnel bus routes and walk to the park from the Aberdeen Tunnel Toll Plaza bus stop.

Car 
The venue is also accessible by taxi, private hire car or personal car. The park provides some car park spaces close to the main entrance, however, the car park can be busy during peak times. Road access is via Route 1 (Aberdeen Tunnel) from central and eastern districts of Hong Kong Island, Kowloon, New Territories or Pok Fu Lam Road from western districts.

Future Developments

'Ocean Park Future Strategy' 
Amid the COVID-19 pandemic and social unrest in the city, Ocean Park has been struggling financially since 2019, reporting loses of over HKD$5 millon each year. Looking for a lower financial risk, Ocean Park plans to attract investors by outsourcing parts of its theme park for designated future purposes. These incluse an RDE district in The Waterfront, an 'adventure zone' in its former Adventure Land, a 'wellness zone' in its Marine World and a former unused land, next to the existing 'The Fullerton Ocean Park Hong Kong' resort hotel and Water World, a new-built second generation waterpark and a new pay-per-ride system for its existing rides in the Summit. These developments are set to be rolled out from the 2026/27 season.

Conservation
Ocean Park conducts education and research into animal conservation, by operating observatories, laboratories, an education department, and the Ocean Park Conservation Foundation, Hong Kong (OPCFHK), a fund that advocates, facilitates and participates in the conservation of wildlife and habitats, with an emphasis on Asia, through research and education. In 2013/2014, the foundation funded 44 conservation projects, covering 30 species in 12 countries with a total of HK$13 million (out of the Park's total turnover of HK$2 billion), a sharp increase over funding a few years earlier. The foundation was formed in 2005 from the merger of two earlier organisations, the Ocean Park Conservation Foundation (OPCF), founded 1993, and the Hong Kong Society for Panda Conservation (HKSPC), founded 1999.

Ocean Park Hong Kong was the first institution in the world to successfully artificially inseminate bottlenose dolphins, and has developed several new breeds of goldfish.

Since 2006, OPCFHK has collaborated with the Hong Kong Agriculture, Fisheries and Conservation Department to handle cetacean stranding cases within Hong Kong waters. After the 2008 earthquake in Sichuan, OPCFHK established a Giant Panda Base Rebuilding Fund and donated equipment to the affected nature reserves.

Ocean Park has created education programmes, such as the Ocean Park Academy (OPA), begun in 2004, through which the Park runs educational tours for schoolchildren and workshops for teachers from the Hong Kong Institute of Education. Every year, the Park offers over 35 core courses for around 46,000 students on six big topics: giant pandas and red pandas, dolphins and sea lions, birds, fishes, plants, and mechanical rides.

The Marine Mammal Breeding and Research Centre set up by Ocean Park serves as a centre to house nine dolphins and conduct research on the breeding of dolphins. It is divided into 6 separate activity zones, and provides behavioural training and basic husbandry to the dolphins. It also plays a part in research work on the echolocation capabilities of dolphins. For five weeks in 2013, the centre was open for public visits.

Criticism
Ocean Park has been criticised by wildlife advocates for certain practices including the wild capture of large sea animals, such as dolphins and orca, and the presentation of shows featuring such animals performing. Opponents have highlighted their views on international "Empty the Tanks" day – a non-violent multinational demonstration that aims to end the capture and sale of wild dolphins to marine parks, where the creatures are said to die younger and breed much less. There is concern for the psychological state of the mammals alongside their physiological needs. And the advocates say it sends the wrong message, not only to visitors but also to marine parks in mainland China, which, if they copied the Park's practices, could have a significant impact on wild populations.

Ocean Park has posted HK$31.8 million deficit in the financial year ending 30 June 2021, despite receiving HK$1.45 billion government funding.

Major annual events
Ocean Park hosts six major events throughout the year: an Kidsfest, Animal in High Definition Month, the Ocean Park Summer Splash, the Halloween Bash and Christmas and Chinese New Year celebrations.

Halloween Bash 

Since 2008, the Park has held a popular annual Halloween Bash through the month of October. Themes such as "Fear Formula" and "Haunted Hong Kong" provide modern twists on the traditional halloween rituals, including various attractions and activities.

Animal in High Definition Month 
The Animal in High Definition Months enable visitors to encounter a variety of rare animals up close, with educational experts on hand to disseminate information about these creatures. The Animal in High Definition Month for 2010 had a reptile theme called, "Mighty Dragons". In 2012, the event let visitors explore Chinese national treasures, featuring the display of two Sichuan golden monkeys.

Ocean Park Summer Splash 
The event is held each summer, with visitors partaking in various wet and wild thrills, including water games and water slides.

Christmas Sensation 
Christmas themed celebrations held from December to January every year.

Chinese New Year Fiesta 

Chinese New Year celebration events are held around January to February every year. The celebration usually features lantern displays, God of Fortune visits, lion and dragon dances. In 2013, the CNY Fiesta featured a 12-metre spinning lantern, as well as a traditional Chinese drum show.

Kidsfest

Attendance

Awards
The park has won several awards, including The World's Seventh Most Popular Amusement Park and one of the "50 Most Visited Tourist Attractions in the world" by Forbes. In November 2012, Ocean Park became the first theme park in Asia to win the Applause Award from the International Association of Amusement Parks and Attractions. Also, one of their pandas Jia Jia (giant panda) won a spot in the guinness book of world records for reaching the highest age of pandas in captivity.

Incidents
 On 5 December 2010, seven tourists were injured when a train driver triggered the emergency braking system by mistake on the Ocean Express tunnel railway. Ocean Park was required to install caps over the emergency brake button for their trains before reopening.
 On 10 April 2014, a 50-year-old man on holiday from Hubei, China, fell to his death as he was sitting on a railing. He lost balance and fell 11 metres down from the area known as The Summit. Police said an initial investigation found nothing suspicious and indicated it was an accident.
 On 16 September 2017, a 21-year-old man died inside Ocean Park's 2017 Halloween attraction called "Buried Alive", where guests lie in a coffin until the bottom drops out, sending them down a slide. The man had accidentally entered a staff-only area, and was hit on the head by the coffin bottom. The man was sent to Ruttonjee Hospital and certified dead. Legislators and industry experts questioned why the dangerous restricted area was not locked and marked clearly with warning signage.

See also

Amusement parks in Hong Kong
 Allan Zeman, Chairman of Ocean Park from July 2003 to June 2014
Tourism in Hong Kong
Hong Kong Zoological and Botanical Gardens
Kadoorie Farm and Botanic Garden

References

External links

40 years passed on Documentary by RTHK

1977 establishments in Hong Kong
Animal theme parks
Amusement parks in Hong Kong
Funicular railways in Hong Kong
Gondola lifts
Nam Long Shan
Oceanaria
Underground funiculars
Tourist attractions in Hong Kong
Wong Chuk Hang
Zoos in Hong Kong
Amusement parks opened in 1977